Nesolycaena is a genus of butterflies in the family Lycaenidae. The members (species) are found in the Australasian realm.

Species
Nesolycaena albosericea (Miskin, 1891)
Nesolycaena caesia d'Apice & Miller, 1992
Nesolycaena medicea Braby, 1996
Nesolycaena urumelia (Tindale, 1922)

External links

Funet Taxonomy Distribution
  1996: A new species of Nesolycaena Waterhouse and Turner (Lepidoptera: Lycaenidae) from Northeastern Australia. Australian journal of entomology, 35: 9-17. . Full article: .

Candalidini
Lycaenidae genera